The Association of Youth Organizations Nepal (AYON) is a non-political, non-religious, non-governmental, not-for-profit, autonomous network of Youth Organizations and as such, a platform for collaboration, cooperation, joint action and collective endeavor between Youth Organizations in Nepal. So far, 92 youth organizations have registered with AYON. The organisation is situated in New Baneshwor, Kathmandu.

AYON took lead during the Nepali earthquake and mobilized thousands of youth volunteers. Immediately after the disastrous earthquake, within just 23 hours Association of Youth Organizations Nepal (AYON) in coordination with various youth groups like Come on Youth Stand Up initiated #act4quake youth group within to respond to the earthquake disaster.

(AYON), together with other local, national, and international agencies, has been involved in relief works from immediately after the earthquake mobilizing more than 900 youth volunteers in 14 districts. The youth volunteers team meets the people, make the community, does the medical emergency medical treatments, cleans the area to stop the epidemics and in some locations like Sankhu, Nuwakot building temporary bamboo houses.
 
To date {16 May 2015} it has reached more than 140 villages of 14 districts and its teams including medical persons are reaching to un-reached and un-served areas with relief materials.

Member organisations 
In 2015, AYON works with 987 member organisations, situated in Nepal:

Definitions 

These definitions are according to AYON.
Youth: Youth is an individual, male or female, of any class, caste, creed, origin or religion, who is of the age group between 16 years to 35 years. To compare the Youth definition of the United Nation is between 15 and 24 years old.

Youth Organization: Youth Organization is an organization run by youth, conducting activities directly targeting youth, for the development of youth. These organizations should have at least 75% youths in its membership base and the executive committee.

Objectives 
 To act as an umbrella organization for Youth Organizations in Nepal to foster cooperation, dialogue, network and collaboration for youth empowerment and development
 To advocate, lobby and facilitate mainstreaming of youth issues in the National agenda.
 To organize capacity building programs, trainings and workshops to strengthen the network and its member organizations.
 To serve as consulting and advisory body to the government agencies and relevant stakeholders regarding youth issues in Nepal.
 To organize various youth events having national and international significance.
 To represent Nepalese youth in international policy/decision making bodies, associations, conferences, and various fora.
 To build network and alliance with international youth organizations and networks to foster youth development.

References

The Loyal Youth Club -Salyan

External links
 Official website

Community organizations
Youth organisations based in Nepal